Brembate is a comune (municipality) in the Province of Bergamo in the Italian region of Lombardy, located about  northeast of Milan and about  southwest of Bergamo.

The municipality of Brembate only contains the frazione (subdivision) Grignano.

Brembate borders the following municipalities: Boltiere, Canonica d'Adda, Capriate San Gervasio, Filago, Osio Sotto, Pontirolo Nuovo.

Demographic evolution

References

External links
 www.comune.brembate.bg.it